

Joachim Rumohr (6 August 1910 – 11 February 1945) was a German SS commander during the Nazi era. He commanded the SS Cavalry Division Florian Geyer. 

On 1 April 1944, Rumohr was appointed commander of the 8th SS Cavalry Division Florian Geyer. In November 1944, he was promoted to Brigadeführer and led the division during the fighting in Budapest. Rumohr was a recipient of the Knight's Cross of the Iron Cross with Oak Leaves. He was seriously wounded during the attempt to break out from the city. Faced with surrender to the Soviet Red Army, Rumohr committed suicide on 11 February 1945.

Awards
 Iron Cross 2nd Class (14 November 1939) & 1st Class  (28 August 1940)
 German Cross in Gold on 23 February 1943 as SS-Obersturmbannführer in Artillerie-Regiment SS-Kavillerie-Division
 Knight's Cross of the Iron Cross with Oak Leaves
 Knight's Cross on 16 January 1944 as SS-Obersturmbannführer and commander of SS-Artillerie-Regiment 8 "Florian Geyer"
 Oak Leaves on 1 February 1945 as SS-Brigadeführer and commander of 8. SS-Kavillerie-Division "Florian Geyer"

References

Citations

Bibliography

 
 
 

1910 births
1945 suicides
Military personnel from Hamburg
SS-Brigadeführer
Recipients of the Gold German Cross
Recipients of the Knight's Cross of the Iron Cross with Oak Leaves
Waffen-SS personnel
Nazis who committed suicide
Suicides in Hungary